Richard Leigh (born 7 February 1784 at Wilmington, near Dartford, Kent; died 9 October 1841 at Westminster) was an English amateur cricketer who was mainly associated with Surrey. He made five known appearances in first-class matches from 1806 to 1809. His father, also called Richard Leigh, was a well-known match promoter in the 1790s and there were nine first-class matches featuring R. Leigh's XI.

References

1784 births
1841 deaths
English cricketers
English cricketers of 1787 to 1825
Surrey cricketers
Marylebone Cricket Club cricketers
Kent cricketers
People from Wilmington, Kent